Morgan Lloyd (born 7 June 1999) is a Caymanian artistic gymnast. She represented the Cayman Islands at the 2014 Summer Youth Olympics and 2015 Pan American Games.

Competitive History

2014 

Lloyd competed at the Junior Pan American Championships in Aracaju, Brazil. She finished 34th with an all-around score of 39.334.

At the Summer Youth Olympics, she placed 37th with an all-around score of 41.250.

2015 

At the Pan American Games in Toronto, Lloyd placed 30th in the all-around with a score of 40.050. She advanced to the apparatus final as a reserve. In the final, she scored 41.150 and placed 23rd overall.

References 

1999 births
Caymanian female artistic gymnasts
Gymnasts at the 2014 Summer Youth Olympics
Living people
Gymnasts at the 2015 Pan American Games
Pan American Games competitors for the Cayman Islands